Texas's 30th congressional district of the United States House of Representatives covers much of the city of Dallas and other parts of Dallas and Tarrant counties (primarily black- and Hispanic-majority areas). The district contains the University of North Texas at Dallas, UNT Law, and Texas Women's University at Dallas. The 30th district is also home to Dallas Love Field airport and University of Texas Southwestern Medical Center. The current Representative from the 30th district is Democrat Jasmine Crockett, who has represented the district since 2023.

Election results from presidential races

List of members representing the district

Recent election results

2004

2006

The 2006 congressional race for Texas' 30th district was between long-time incumbent Eddie Bernice Johnson, GOP backed long-time district resident Wilson Aurbach, and Libertarian Ken Ashby.

2008

2010

2012

2014

2016

2018

2020

Historical district boundaries

In popular culture
The 30th congressional district plays a role in the first part of season 4 of House Of Cards.

See also
List of United States congressional districts

References

External links 
 Travis Washington Jr. Election Site
 Eddie Bernice Johnson Official Re-election Site
Congressional Biographical Directory of the United States 1774–present

30
Dallas County, Texas